The 2022 Charlotte Edwards Cup was the second edition of the Charlotte Edwards Cup, an English women's cricket Twenty20 domestic competition, which took place between 14 May and 11 June 2022. It featured eight teams playing in two double round-robin groups, followed by a Finals Day. The tournament ran alongside the Rachael Heyhoe Flint Trophy. The tournament was named after former England captain Charlotte Edwards. The tournament was won by Southern Vipers, beating Central Sparks in the final.

Format
Teams played in two groups, based on finishing positions in the 2021 edition of the tournament. Teams played each team in their group twice, home and away, with the two group winners and the best second-place team advancing to Finals Day, played at the County Ground, Northampton. The best group winner advanced straight to the final, whilst the other two teams played off in a semi-final.

Teams
The teams were as follows:
 Central Sparks (representing Warwickshire, Worcestershire, Herefordshire, Shropshire and Staffordshire)
 Lightning (representing Loughborough University, Derbyshire, Leicestershire, Nottinghamshire and Lincolnshire)
 Northern Diamonds (representing Yorkshire, Durham and Northumberland)
 North West Thunder (representing Lancashire, Cheshire and Cumbria)
 South East Stars (representing Surrey and Kent)
 Southern Vipers (representing Hampshire, Sussex, Berkshire, Buckinghamshire, Dorset, Isle of Wight and Oxfordshire)
 Sunrisers  (representing Middlesex, Essex, Northamptonshire, Bedfordshire, Cambridgeshire, Hertfordshire, Huntingdonshire, Norfolk and Suffolk)
 Western Storm (representing Glamorgan, Gloucestershire, Somerset, Cornwall, Devon, Wiltshire and Cricket Wales)

Standings
Teams received 4 points for a win. A bonus point was given where the winning team's run rate was 1.25 or greater times that of the opposition. In case of a tie in the standings, the following tiebreakers were applied in order: highest net run rate, team that scored the most points in matches involving the tied parties, better bowling strike rate, drawing of lots.

Group A

Group B

 advanced to the final
 advanced to the semi-final

Fixtures
Source:

Group A

Group B

Finals Day

Semi-final

Final

Statistics
Highest score by a team: South East Stars – 183/9 (20 overs) v Sunrisers (5 June).
 Top score by an individual: Lauren Winfield-Hill – 96 (51) v Lightning (14 May).
 Best bowling figures by an individual: Katie Levick – 5/15 (4 overs) v Southern Vipers (21 May) and Sophie Ecclestone – 5/15 (4 overs) v Lightning (3 June).

Most runs

Source: ESPNCricinfo

Most wickets

Source: ESPNCricinfo

References

 Charlotte Edwards Cup
2022 in English women's cricket